Central High School is a public high school founded in 1870, and located in downtown Louisville, Kentucky, United States. The school has many prominent alumni including civil rights campaigner William Warley, and boxer Muhammad Ali. 

It was the first African-American high school in the state of Kentucky; and it was a segregated school for African American students from 1870 until 1956. It was formerly known as Central Colored High School, and formally known as  Louisville Central High School Magnet Career Academy.

19th and 20th-century history
Central High School opened on October 7, 1873 and was located at Sixth and Kentucky; it was the first African-American high school in the state of Kentucky. The first class of students enrolled was 87 pupils and they received 2 years of high school-level education.

After the formation of Central High School, neighboring Kentucky cities added their own segregated public schools for African American students including Paris Colored High School in Paris; Clinton Street High School (later known as Mayo–Underwood School) in Frankfort; William Grant High School in Covington; Russell School in Lexington; Lincoln High School in Paducah; and Winchester High School in Winchester. The Central High School would go on to have four other locations: Ninth and Magazine Streets, Ninth and Chestnut Streets, Eighth and Chestnut Streets, and its current location of Eleventh and Chestnut Streets since 1952. 

The school was renamed Central Colored High School in 1892 and John Maxwell was its first principal. William Warley, civil rights campaigner, attended Central and while a student in 1902 prepared a speech about the inferior educational offerings available to African Americans in Louisville. 

Until 1956, Louisville Central High School was the only public high school in the city for African Americans. The United States Supreme Court struck down racial segregation in public schools in 1954 in the famous Brown v. Board of Education, Topeka, Kansas case. In 1956, Louisville public schools desegregated.

Louisville Central High School and the rest of the Louisville school system played a part in both integration efforts and the Cold War. In 1957, as many around the world began to take notice of racial problems within the United States, the United States Information Agency produced promotional materials touting "The Louisville Story" as an example of peaceful integration.

About 

Specializing in preparing students for professional careers, Central High School offers many magnet programs. As an all-magnet school, it has no home district, instead it brings in students from throughout the Jefferson County Public School System. Magnet programs offered include:

The Law and Government magnet is the only program like it in the JCPS school system, directed by Joe Gutmann. The Law and Government magnet has a signature partnership with the University of Louisville and Louisville Bar Association.

Louisville Central High School offers Kentucky's first public high school Montessori program. Dr. Montessori's vision for cosmic education, micro-economics, grace, and peace, is paired with Central's successful career themed magnet program.

Athletics
In the 1950s, Central High School won three national basketball high school championships. In 1983, Central High School won the WAVE-TV's High Q Championship. In 2007, when Central won the 3A State Football Championship, Head Coach Ty Scroggins became the first African-American high school coach in Kentucky history to win a state football championship.  On December 12, 2008, Central's football team repeated the feat of winning the 3A State Championship, becoming the first Louisville public high school to do so in 44 years. In 2008, Central was listed by U.S. News & World Report as one of America's best high schools.

Louisville Central's 2007, 2008, 2010, 2011, 2012 and 2018 football team become 3A champions and their basketball team won 2008's regional basketball championship. It one of two schools in the county attending the sweet sixteen games.  Their band, featuring the "Yellow Jacket Drumline", "The Twirlettes" and the "Stingettes" majorette dance team, has become one of the most talented musical ensembles in the region; it is also the first in the county to incorporate majorettes.

In 2009, the Central High School basketball team (which started 0-8) repeated as regional basketball champions and advanced to the sweet sixteen championship game against Holmes High School. Central also swept the boys' and girls' 2-A Track & Field Regional Championship titles.

In 2010 Central made history by beating the Belfry Pirates to win the 3A Conference Championship. This is their 3rd championship in four seasons.

In 2011 Central again made history by beating Phillip Haywood's' Belfry Pirates in the KHSAA 3A State Championship. This was their 4th Championship in five seasons.

In December 2012 for the 3rd consecutive year Central High School claimed the KHSAA 3A State Championship. They defeated the Belfry Pirates with a score of 12-6. This was their 5th championship in 6 seasons.

On November 30, 2018, the Yellow Jackets won another KHSAA 3A State Championship, their first under coach Marvin Dantzler.

Central High School is located at 1130 W. Chestnut Street, and the principal is Dr. Tamela Compton.

Racial preference controversy

Until 2000, all high schools in Jefferson County were required to maintain a percentage of African-American students between 15 and 50%. In 2000, a group of black parents sued after their children were denied admission to Central High School. As a result, U.S. District Judge John Heyburn II struck down the use of race-conscious school assignment procedures for Jefferson County magnet and traditional schools such as Central.

Notable alumni and faculty

 Muhammad Ali, Class of 1960, three-time World Heavyweight Champion and boxing Hall of Famer
 Elmer Lucille Allen, ceramic artist and first African-American chemist at Brown-Forman
 Yvonne Young Clark, first woman to graduate from Howard University with a Bachelor of Science degree in Mechanical Engineering
 Keelan Cole, NFL wide receiver with the Las Vegas Raiders
 Jimmy Ellis, former WBA Heavyweight champion
 Sam Gilliam, artist
 Lyman T. Johnson, plaintiff in Federal Court case that desegregated the University of Kentucky in 1949
 Lenny Lyles, 11-season NFL player, mostly with the Baltimore Colts
 Bob Miller, NBA basketball player for the San Antonio Spurs
 Darryl Owens, Kentucky State Representative
 Greg Page, former WBA Heavyweight champion
 Corey Peters, NFL player with the Jacksonville Jaguars
 Maurice Rabb, Jr., University of Illinois ophthalmologist
 D'Angelo Russell, NBA player with the Los Angeles Lakers attended only his freshman year.
 Ed Smallwood, basketball player
 C. J. Spillman, former NFL player 
 Bob Thompson, painter
 William Warley, lawyer, editor, and civil rights leader

See also
 Public schools in Louisville, Kentucky

References

Further reading

External links
 

Jefferson County Public Schools (Kentucky)
Educational institutions established in 1870
Public high schools in Kentucky
Magnet schools in Kentucky
1870 establishments in Kentucky
High schools in Louisville, Kentucky
African-American history in Louisville, Kentucky
Historically segregated African-American schools in Kentucky